Jim Thompson (born in Lincoln County, Oregon) is an American politician and a former Republican member of the Oregon House of Representatives representing District 23 from 2009 to 2015. Thompson served non-consecutively in the seat from his appointment in 2004 to fill the vacancy caused by the resignation of Lane Shetterly until January 2005. In September 2015 Thompson registered with the Independent Party of Oregon to run again for District 23.

Education
Thompson attended Western Oregon University and Oregon State University.

Elections
2004 Thompson ran in the five-way May 18, 2004 Republican Primary but took second to Brian Boquist, Boquist won the three-way November 2, 2004 General election and served in the seat until 2009.
2008 When Republican Representative Boquist ran for Oregon Senate and left the District 23 seat open, Thompson won the May 20, 2008 Republican Primary with 4,137 votes (61.4%), and won the November 4, 2008 General election with 15,878 votes (57.4%) against Democratic nominee Jason Brown, who had run for the seat in 2006.
2010 Thompson was unopposed for the May 18, 2010, Republican primary, winning with 5,387 votes, and won the November 2, 2010 General election with 16,371 votes (68.0%) against Democratic nominee Wesley West, who had lost the 2008 Democratic Primary to Jason Brown.
2012 Thompson was unopposed for the May 15, 2012, Republican primary, winning with 5,039 votes, and won the three-way November 6, 2012 General election with 17,864 votes (59.1%) against Democratic nominee Ross Swartzendruber and Pacific Green Party candidate Alex Polikoff.
2014 Thompson was defeated in the May 20, 2014, Republican primary, losing to Mike Nearman, a software engineer from Independence. The Oregonian identified the incumbent's defeat as an example of a more conservative Republican challenger ousting a relative moderate, noting Thompson's support for same-sex marriage as an issue that inflamed conservatives.

References

External links
Official page at the Oregon Legislative Assembly
Campaign site
 

Year of birth missing (living people)
Living people
Republican Party members of the Oregon House of Representatives
Oregon State University alumni
People from Dallas, Oregon
People from Lincoln County, Oregon
Western Oregon University alumni
21st-century American politicians
Independent Party of Oregon politicians